Holubia is a genus of beetles in the family Buprestidae, containing the following species:

 Holubia gabonica Bellamy, 2008
 Holubia kheili Obenberger, 1924

References

Buprestidae genera